A fail-silent system is a type of system that either provides the correct service, or provides no service at all (becomes silent).

See also 
Design by contract
Fail-fast
Fail-safe
Fail-stop
Fault tolerance

References 

Fault-tolerant computer systems
Safety